Justh is a surname. Notable people with the surname include:

Gyula Justh (1850–1917), Hungarian jurist and politician
Ina Justh (born 1969), German rower
 (1863–1894), Hungarian writer

See also
Just (surname)

Surnames of European origin